The painted tree-rat (Callistomys pictus) is a species of spiny rat from Brazil, restricted to north-eastern Bahia in eastern Brazil. It is the only species in the genus Callistomys.

Identification
With a total length of ca. 30 cm (12 in), it is a relatively large species of spiny rat. It is white with a strongly contrasting glossy-black cap, back and band down towards its forelimbs. Its long fur is dense and coarse, but not spiny, as in some other members of its family. Specimens often have brown (rather than black) markings, but as far as it is known this is caused by fading and does not occur in the living animals.

Owing to its striking black-and-white pelage, it is virtually unmistakable, but could perhaps be confused with a hairy dwarf porcupine (Coendou spp.) – all of which have spines and lack the distinctive pattern of the painted tree-rat.

Etymology
 The species name derives from the Latin word pictus meaning colored, decorated, and refers to the white and black fur of this rodent.

Habitat
The painted tree-rat is found in the Atlantic forest. It also occurs in cocoa plantations where some native trees remain. As far as known, it is nocturnal.

Phylogeny
The painted tree-rat has been placed in different genera: Nelomys, Loncheres, or Isothrix. However, analyses of DNA and protein characters showed that the genus Callistomys is the sister group to the genus Myocastor (coypus or nutrias). In turn, these two taxa share evolutionary affinities with other Myocastorini genera: Proechimys and Hoplomys (armored rats) on the one hand, and Thrichomys on the other hand.

Conservation status
The painted tree-rat is currently listed as Endangered by the IUCN because of its fragmented distribution, its continuing decline and the quality of its habitat. An outlying record was not included in the assessment.

See also

References

External links
ARKive: Images and movies of the Painted tree-rat (Callistomys pictus)

Echimyidae
Mammals described in 1841
Taxa named by François Jules Pictet de la Rive